Dalmazio Santini (September 11, 1923 – October 4, 2001) was an Italian-born American composer.

Early life
Santini was born in Capestrano in the Abruzzo province of Italy. He immigrated to the United States at age 14. He attended public schools in White Plains, New York.

He was inducted into the US Armed Forces and served in World War II, eventually settling in Valhalla, New York.  Following the war, the G.I. Bill allowed him the opportunity to study composition at Manhattanville College and the Mannes College of Music.  Santini studied composition with Felix Salzer and Tadeusz Kassern, and conducting with Milton Forstat.

Musical career
Santini developed a system of composition using 21-tone rows.  This system is similar to the more familiar 12-tone system of serial composition, but the rows Santini used as the basis of his 21-tone compositions also include all alternative enharmonic spellings for each note in the chromatic scale (except the notes D, G, and A, which have no enharmonic spellings).  Thus, the available tones for a 21-tone row would include B-sharp, C, C-sharp, D-flat, D, D-sharp, E-flat, E, F-flat, E-sharp, F, F-sharp, G-flat, G, G-sharp, A-flat, A, A-sharp, B-flat, B, and C-flat.  In order to generate 21-tone rows, Santini utilized a specially printed deck of cards (each card representing one of the aforementioned pitches), "dealing" himself rows until he found the row or rows he wished to use as the basis for a particular composition.

Other of Santini's innovations include the use of circular notation (in his Continuum for accordion), as well as quarter tones (which he referred to as "quasi tones").  His 2+4,+ calls for inside-the-piano playing as well as other techniques so avant-garde as to approach the theatrical, reminiscent of a John Cage "happening."

Many of Santini's other works are composed in a gentle, tonal, and more accessible style.  Much of his output is for piano, and his numerous accordion works have been performed worldwide.  His most widely performed composition, Ave Maria, has been recorded by the duo of vocalist Mary Mancini and accordionist Mario Tacca.

Santini's many works for orchestra include The White Peaks of Forca and Canti Gabrieleschi.  These works are also tonal, though modern in style, and draw on Santini's Italian heritage.  His Canticum Angelicum was performed by the orchestra of the Teatro dell'Opera San Carlo in Naples.  Among his last works is a concerto for viola and orchestra, composed with the 21-tone system.

A devout Roman Catholic, much of Santini's output is sacred in nature, often with Latin texts.  His Magnificat was selected for performance at the 1992 Incontri di Musica Sacra Contemporanea festival in Rome, Italy.

Santini's music was self-published by his own company, DelSan Publications.

Retirement and death
Upon his retirement in 1981, Santini moved to Cape Coral in southwest Florida. He died in nearby Fort Myers in 2001.

External links
Dalmazio Santini at New Music Jukebox

1923 births
2001 deaths
20th-century classical composers
American male classical composers
American classical composers
Italian classical composers
Italian emigrants to the United States
People from Cape Coral, Florida
People from the Province of L'Aquila
People from Valhalla, New York
Manhattanville College alumni
20th-century Italian composers
20th-century American composers
20th-century American male musicians